The 1924 Ottawa Rough Riders finished in 3rd place in the Interprovincial Rugby Football Union with a 2–4 record and failed to qualify for the playoffs for the 12th consecutive season, the longest such drought in club history. This would also be the last season as the "Rough Riders" before changing to the name "Senators" for the next six seasons.

Regular season

Standings

Schedule

References

Ottawa Rough Riders seasons